A mask is a covering worn on the face.

Mask may also refer to:

Computing and technology 
 Affinity mask, a bit mask indicating what processor a thread or process should be run on
 Mask (computing), in computer science, a bit pattern used to extract information from another bit pattern
 Photomask, used to create the circuit layers in IC fabrication
 Front-end mask, an automobile accessory
 Image mask, applied to digital images to "cut-out" the background or other unwanted features
 Respirator, an air filter worn as a mask over nose and mouth
 Shadow mask, a technology used to manufacture cathode ray tube televisions that produce color images
 Spectral mask, a mathematically defined set of lines applied to the levels of radio transmissions in telecommunications
 umask, the default permission setting for new files on UNIX systems

Film and television 
 Mask (1985 film), a film directed by Peter Bogdanovich
 M.A.S.K., a media franchise comprising toys, animated series, and other media
 M.A.S.K. (TV series), an animated television series
 Mask (2015 TV series), a South Korean television series
 Mask (2018 film), a Bengali film directed by Rajiv Biswas
 Mask (2019 film), a Malayalam film directed by Sunif Hanif
 Masks (1929 film), a German film directed by Rudolf Meinert
 Masks (1987 film), a French film directed by Claude Chabrol
 Masked (film), a 1920 Western starring Hoot Gibson
 "Masks" (Star Trek: The Next Generation), a 1994 seventh season episode of the TV series Star Trek: The Next Generation

Fiction
 Mask (Forgotten Realms), a deity in the Dungeons & Dragons Forgotten Realms campaign setting
 Masks (Angel comic), a comic based on the Angel television series
 Mask (DC Comics), a fictional DC Comics character
 Masks, an eight issue mini series by Dynamite Entertainment
 Mask De Mascline, a fictional character from Bleach

Music 
 Mask (Aco album), 2006
 Mask (Bauhaus album), 1981
 Mask (Fanatic Crisis album), 1996
 Mask (Roger Glover album), 1984
 Mask (Vangelis album), 1985
 "Mask" (song), a 2021 song by Dream
 "Mask", a song by James from the album Living in Extraordinary Times
 Mask, a 1980s rock band whose vocalist was José Fors

Other uses 
 Anti-mask laws, regulations against covering the face
Cloth face mask, used for source control in epidemics
 Facial mask, applied to the face and used for cosmetic skin treatment
 Masking (art), materials used to protect portions of a work from unintended change, such as masking tape, frisket, and stencils
 Masking (illustration), a drawing technique that originated in Japan
 "Mask", nickname of Charles Lewis Jr. (1963–2009), co-founder of clothing line TapouT
 MASK, an MI5 operation (1934–1937) that decrypted Communist International radio communications
 Mask, Mazandaran, a village in Mazandaran Province, Iran
 Mask, South Khorasan, a village in South Khorasan Province, Iran
 Surgical mask, personal protective equipment

See also
 
 
 Face mask (disambiguation)
 Masked ball (disambiguation)
 The Mask (disambiguation)
 Masque